Anthony M. Kelly (February 18, 1919 – March 1, 1987) was an American professional basketball player. He played for the Sheboygan Red Skins in the National Basketball League for three seasons and averaged 3.9 points per game.

References

1919 births
1987 deaths
American men's basketball players
Baltimore Bullets (1944–1954) players
Basketball players from Chicago
DePaul Blue Demons men's basketball players
Guards (basketball)
Marquette Golden Eagles men's basketball players
Professional Basketball League of America players
Sheboygan Red Skins players